Shilpa Tulaskar (born 10 March 1977) is an Indian actress who has acted in Marathi films and Hindi television shows.

She recently portrayed the role of Rajnandini in Zee Marathi's drama Tula Pahate Re and also the character of Sujata, mother of the male lead Atharva, in Jana Na Dil Se Door on Star Plus.

Personal life and education
Tulaskar was born in Matunga, Maharashtra and completed her education from Ramnarain Ruia College. She is married to Vishal Shetty, with whom she has two children.

Career
Her first television role was in the episode Kiley ka Rahasya of Byomkesh Bakshi (1993) as Tulsi (credited as Shilpa Toraskar), broadcasteby Doordarshan,  followed by Shanti, where she played the role of Ranjana in 1994. She then appeared in the Marathi TV show Vaibhav. Tulaskar acted in films Devaki (2001), Dombivali Fast (2005), Kalchakra (2008) and television serial Ladies Special (Sony TV).

Tulaskar also has a number of plays to her credit. She also played roles in Dill Mill Gayye, Veer Shivaji on Colors, and Queen Menavati (Goddess Parvati's mother) in Devon Ke Dev...Mahadev.

Filmography
 9 Malabar Hill
 Veer Shivaji as Jijabai
 Rishtey Episode 14
 Pal Chhin as Charulata on (Star Plus) 
 Kavach (unknown) 
 Bandhan on (DD Metro)
 Byomkesh Bakshi (TV series) (Episode: Kiley ka Rahasya) as Tulsi (credited as Shilpa Toraskar) (Doordarshan)
 Hero - Bhakti Hi Shakti Hai... as Sunaina Sehgal (Joy's Mother) (Season 1 &3)
 Shanti... as Shyama
 Teacher (Zee TV)
 Hudd Kar Di... as Namrata Singh Dhanwa
 Dill Mill Gayye... as Padma Bansal Gupta 
 Jersey No. 10... as Leela Salgaonkar
 Kaisa Ye Pyar Hai... as Avantika Agarwal
 Ladies Special... as Nanda Shinde
 Bhaskar Bharti... as Nanda Shinde
 Chand Chupa Badal Mein (cameo)... as herself
 Devon Ke Dev - Mahadev (Hindi) as Queen Mena
 Hero Hungama TV as Sunaina Sehgal
 Kyun Hota Hai Pyarrr as Aarti Sharma
 Jaana Na Dil Se Door as Sujata, Atharva's mother
 Ek Deewaana Tha as Sadhvi
 Yeh Hai Mohabbatein as Mrs. Savita (Cameo)
 Tula Pahate Re as Rajnandini Saranjame / Rajnandini Gejendra Patil
 Rang Maza Vegla as Herself (Cameo appearance)
 Dadi Amma... Dadi Amma Maan Jaao! as Rekha, an industrialist
 Mere Sai - Shraddha Aur Saburi as Saras (Cameo)
 Tu Tevha Tashi as Anamika Dixit (lead role) 
FilmsThodi Thodi Si Manmaaniyan as Saroj Deep KaulDevakiDombivli Fast Anandache ZhaadKalchakraSanai ChoughadeMujhse Fraaandship Karoge (Hindi)Krazy 4BhatukaliSugar, Salt ani PremEnte Ummante Peru (Malayalam film)Fera Feri Hera Feri (Gujarati film)SohalaTheatreJavai Maza Bhala (Marathi)To Karo Shree Ganesh (Gujarati)Savita Damodar Paranjpe (Hindi Zee Theatre)Just Another Rape (English)Lahanpan Dega Deva'' (Marathi)

References

External links

Actresses in Marathi cinema
Indian television actresses
1977 births
Living people
Marathi actors
Actresses in Hindi television
Actresses in Hindi cinema
Actors from Mumbai